Étang de la Bonde is a lake in Vaucluse, France. Its surface area is 0.3 km².

The lake is shared by the communes of Cabrières-d'Aigues and La Motte-d'Aigues.

Bonde
Landforms of Vaucluse